CD64 can refer to:

 CD64 (biology)
 CD64 (Nintendo)